Chinese Whispers is a 2002 poetry collection by the American writer John Ashbery. It was Ashbery's 20th collection and consists of 65 individual poems.

Reception
Jeremy Noel Tod of The Guardian called Ashbery "a great nonsense poet", and held forward similarities between his poetry and that of Samuel Foote, Lewis Carroll and Edward Lear. Tod grouped Chinese Whispers with Ashbery's last few collections, which he considered to also be concerned with time and old age, and wrote: "Although always oblique about the author's own life, these thick recent collections do feel like diaries. They are various, and they are of uneven quality. A more polished volume could have been compiled from about a third of the poems here. But it suits Ashbery to be prodigal and let the reader choose."

See also
 2002 in poetry
 American literature

References

2002 poetry books
American poetry collections
Poetry by John Ashbery
Farrar, Straus and Giroux books